The 2010 USAC Silver Crown Champ Car Series season was the 39th season of the USAC Silver Crown Series. The series began with the Copper on Dirt at USA Raceway on February 20, and ended on October 16 at the Rollie Beale Classic at Toledo Speedway. Bud Kaeding began the season as the defending champion, and Levi Jones was the season champion.

Schedule/Results

References

USAC Silver Crown Series
United States Auto Club